Maurice Ernest Stanley Roberts (5 July 1922 – April 1993) was an English professional footballer who played in the Football League for Brentford as an outside left.

Personal life 
By February 1951, Roberts had recovered from a case of "sudden blindness".

Career statistics

References

1922 births
English footballers
English Football League players
Brentford F.C. players
Footballers from Bristol
Bristol City F.C. players
1993 deaths
Association football outside forwards
Association football midfielders